Maurice Shanahan (born 1 February 1990) is an Irish hurler who plays as a right corner-forward at senior level for the Waterford county team.

Born in Lismore, County Waterford, Shanahan first played competitive hurling during his schooling at Blackwater Community School. He arrived on the inter-county scene at the age of seventeen when he first linked up with the Waterford minor team, before later joining the under-21 side. He made his senior debut during the 2009 championship. Shanahan immediately became a regular member of the starting fifteen and has won one Munster medal and one National Hurling League medal.

At club level Shanahan plays with Lismore.

His brother, Dan, also had a lengthy career with Waterford.

In 2015, Maurice spoke candidly to the Irish media about suffering from depression, and he was widely praised for speaking out as a high profile sportsperson on the topic.

Club
Shanahan has played with his club, Lismore since a young age.  Shandy presently plays in the half forward line for the club and is the club primary free taker and is well known for his accuracy and towering height of 6 foot five inches. Lismore reached the county final in 2009 with Shanahan playing a pivotal role. Old foes Ballygunner provided the opposition, and after an epic 2 game contest, it was the city side who claimed the cup, leaving the cathedral men disappointed at the final hurdle once more. The next few years proved unsuccessful for Lismore culminating in a shock relegation from the senior ranks after 47 years as a senior club. The club bounced back immediately in 2016 by winning the county intermediate championship. Lismore and Shanahan also added the Munster Intermediate title that year by seeing off Kerry champions Kilmoyley 2-14 to 0-13, with Shanahan scoring 1-9.

Inter-county
Shanahan first came to attention for Waterford in 2009 at U-21 level by giving an outstanding display against a hotly fancied Tipperary outfit winning 3-21 to 2-14. Waterford lost to Clare in the Munster final.
Shanahan made his Senior Inter-county debut for Waterford against Tipperary in the first round of the 2009 National Hurling League.
2009 continued to be a successful year for the young man considered to be one of the hottest young properties in inter-county hurling as he made his championship debut coming off the bench against Tipperary in the Munster final on 12 July making his immediate impact on the game by almost scoring a fantastic goal although missing the opportunity at a crucial time. Maurice Shanahan is thought to be Waterford's brightest, upcoming star after his brilliant performance at under 21. Shanahan's tenacity and temperament have led to critics comparing the young man to his brother Dan.

By 2015, Shanahan was a well established member of the Waterford senior hurling team. A youthful Deise side surprised many by winning only their third National Hurling League year that year with victory over Cork 1-24 to 0-17. They also reached the All Ireland semi final that year but a typically wily Kilkenny were victors 1–20 to 0–18. Shanahan was honoured that year by winning his first All star award.

Career statistics

Honours
Lismore
Waterford Intermediate Hurling Championship (1): 2016
Munster Intermediate Club Hurling Championship (1): 2016

Waterford
Munster Senior Hurling Championship (1): 2010
National Hurling League (1): 2015

Individual
All-Stars (1): 2015

References

1990 births
All Stars Awards winners (hurling)
Living people
Hurling forwards
Lismore hurlers
People from Lismore, County Waterford
Waterford inter-county hurlers